Langerak is a hamlet in the Netherlands and is part of the Coevorden municipality in Drenthe.

Langerak is not a statistical entity, and the postal authorities have placed it under Geesbrug. It was first mentioned in 1899 and means "long straight waterway" which is a reference to the Verlengde Hoogeveensche Vaart which has two bends, but is straight near Langerak. The hamlet consists of about 40 houses.

References 

Coevorden
Populated places in Drenthe